Archaeosynthemis occidentalis is a species of dragonfly of the family Synthemistidae,
known as the western brown tigertail. 
It is a medium-sized dragonfly with reddish-brown and yellow markings.
It is endemic to south-western Australia where it inhabits boggy creeks and swamps.

Archaeosynthemis occidentalis appears similar to Archaeosynthemis orientalis found in eastern Australia.

Gallery

See also
 List of Odonata species of Australia

References

Synthemistidae
Odonata of Australia
Endemic fauna of Australia
Taxa named by Robert John Tillyard
Insects described in 1910